Commonwealth v. Eberle, 474 Pa. 548, 379 A.2d 90 (1977), is a criminal case involving duty to retreat. The case established that in order to counter the justification or excuse of self defense, the prosecution must show that a defendant who used deadly force had a safe opportunity to escape.

References

1977 in United States case law
Self-defense